The players draft for the 2021 Kashmir Premier League took place on 3 July 2021 at the Tulip Banquet Hall in Islamabad. A total of 413 players signed up for the KPL. The players were divided into 7 categories: Icon, Overseas, Platinum, Diamond, Gold, Silver and Emerging. The emerging category was further divided into Overseas Kashmiris, Local Kashmiris and Non-Kashmiris. Each team chose 1 Icon player, 1 Overseas player, 1 Platinum player, 2 Diamond players, 2 Gold players, 3 Silver players and 5 Emerging players. Many people attended the draft including Chairman of the Kashmir Committee Shehryar Khan Afridi, Senator Faisal Javed, President of the KPL: Arif Malik and CEO of the KPL: Chaudhary Shahzad Akhtar.

Players signed up per country

Draft picks

Herschelle Gibbs was the first player to be picked in the draft. Shan Masood was the first non-foreign player to be picked in the draft. The icon players had already been signed prior to the draft.

Draft summary
The following is the summary of the teams.

Post draft signings

References

Kashmir Premier League (Pakistan)